Many countries have political parties that are deemed to represent conservative, center-right, right wing, or Tory views, and which may be referred to informally as conservative parties even if not explicitly named so. Those parties are listed below, many of which are members of the International Democrat Union.

Alphabetical list by country

A
Åland: 
 Moderate Coalition for Åland
 Non-aligned Coalition
Albania:
 Democratic Party of Albania
 Republican Party of Albania
Andorra:
 Democrats for Andorra
Australia:
 Democratic Labor Party
 Australian Conservative
 Katter's Australian Party
 Liberal Party of Australia (Largest party)
 National Party of Australia
 Pauline Hanson's One Nation
Argentina:
 Republican Proposal
Armenia:
 Conservative Party of Armenia
 National Unity
 People's Party
 Prosperous Armenia
 Republican Party of Armenia
Artsakh:
 Artsakh Conservative Party
Austria:
 Austrian People's Party
 Freedom Party of Austria
 Alliance for the Future of Austria
 Christian Party of Austria
 Freedom Party in Carinthia
 The Reform Conservatives

B
Bahamas: 
 Free National Movement
Bangladesh:
 Bangladesh Nationalist Party
Belgium:
 Christlich Soziale Partei
 Centre démocrate humaniste
 New-Flemish Alliance
 Flemish Interest
Belize:
 United Democratic Party
Bolivia:
 Nationalist Democratic Action
Botswana:
 Botswana Democratic Party
Brazil:
 Act
 Brazilian Labour Renewal Party
 Brazil Union
 Christian Democracy
 Liberal Party
 Patriot
 Progressists
 Republicans
Bulgaria:
 GERB
 Bulgarian Rise
 IMRO – Bulgarian National Movement
 Union of Democratic Forces
 George's Day Movement
 Revival
 Volya Movement
 Bulgarian National Unification
 National Front for the Salvation of Bulgaria
 Republicans for Bulgaria

C
Canada: List of conservative parties in Canada (Federal)
Conservative Party of Canada
People's Party of Canada
Alliance of the North
Christian Heritage Party of Canada
Libertarian Party of Canada
National Citizens Alliance
Progressive Canadian Party
Chile:
 National Renewal
 Independent Democratic Union
Colombia:

 Colombian Conservative Party
Costa Rica:
 Social Christian Unity Party
Cyprus:
 Democratic Rally
Czech Republic:
 Civic Democratic Party
 TOP 09
 Christian and Democratic Union – Czechoslovak People's Party
 Tricolour Citizens' Movement
 Conservative Party
 Czech Crown
 SNK European Democrats

D
Denmark:
 Danish People's Party
Centre Party
 Conservative People's Party
Dominica:
 Dominica Freedom Party
Dominican Republic:
 National Progressive Force

E
Ecuador:
 Social Christian Party
Estonia:
 Conservative People's Party of Estonia
 Isamaa
European Union:
 European People's Party
 European Conservatives and Reformists Party

F
Faroe Islands:
 People's Party
Finland:
Christian Democrats
Citizens' Party
Blue Reform
Finnish People First
Finns Party
National Coalition Party
France:
 The Republicans
 National Rally
 Movement for France
 Union of Democrats and Independents
 Reconquête!

G
Germany:
 Christian Democratic Union of Germany
 Christian Social Union of Bavaria
 Alternative for Germany
 Liberal Conservative Reformers
 Bavaria Party
 Centre Party
 Christian Centre
Ghana:
 New Patriotic Party
Gibraltar:
 Gibraltar Social Democrats
Greece:
 New Democracy
Greek Solution
Greeks for the Fatherland
Grenada:
 New National Party
Guatemala:
 National Advancement Party

H
Honduras:
 National Party of Honduras
Hong Kong:
 Pro-Beijing camp
 Democratic Alliance for the Betterment and Progress of Hong Kong
 Business and Professionals Alliance for Hong Kong
 Liberal Party
 New People's Party
Hungary:
 Fidesz
 Christian Democratic People's Party
 Jobbik
 Democratic Community of Welfare and Freedom
 Independent Smallholders, Agrarian Workers and Civic Party

I
Iceland:
 Independence Party
India:
 Bharatiya Janata Party
 Shiv Sena
Indonesia:
 National Awakening Party
 Great Indonesia Movement Party
 United Development Party
 Golkar
 Prosperous Justice Party
 National Mandate Party
Ireland:
 Fine Gael
 Fianna Fáil
 Renua
Irish Freedom Party
National Party
Iran:
 Alliance of Builders of Islamic Iran
 Combatant Clergy Association
 Islamic Coalition Party
 Ansar-e Hezbollah
 Modern Thinkers Party of Islamic Iran
 Moderation and Development Party
 Coalition of Iran's Independent Volunteers
 Society of Devotees of the Islamic Revolution (Isargaran)
Israel:
 Likud
 Shas
 Jewish Power
 Religious Zionism
 The Jewish Home
Italy:
 Forza Italia
 Lega Nord
Brothers of Italy

J
Jamaica:
 Jamaica Labour Party
Japan:
 Liberal Democratic Party (Japan)
 Sanseitō
 Nippon Ishin no Kai
 Democratic Party for the People
 Happiness Realization Party
 Japan First Party
 Ishin Seito Shimpu
 Burdock Party（）
Jersey:
 Centre Party (Jersey)

L
Latvia:
 Unity
 The Conservatives
Lebanon:
 Lebanese Forces Party
 Kataeb Party
 National Liberal Party (Lebanon)
 Free Patriotic Movement (Lebanon)
 National Bloc (Lebanon)
 Future Movement
Lesotho:
 Basotho National Party
Lithuania:
 Homeland Union – Lithuanian Christian Democrats
 Order and Justice

K
Kosovo: 
 Democratic League of Kosovo
 Alliance for the Future of Kosovo

M
Malta:
 Nationalist Party
Mexico:
 National Action Party
 Ecologist Green Party of Mexico
 Social Encounter Party
Mongolia:
 Democratic Party
Mozambique:
 Mozambican National Resistance

N
Netherlands:
Reformed Political Party
Christian Union
Christian Democratic Appeal
Forum for Democracy
New Zealand:
New Zealand National Party
New Conservative Party (New Zealand)
 North Macedonia:
 VMRO-DPMNE
 VMRO – People's Party
Norway:
 Conservative Party
 Progress Party
 Coastal Party

P
Pakistan:
 Pakistan Muslim League (N)
Paraguay:
 National Republican Association – Colorado Party
Peru:
 Sí Cumple
 Cambio 90
 Cambio 90 – New Majority
 New Majority
 Alliance for the Future
 Popular Force
 Popular Renewal
 Alliance for Progress
 We Are Peru
 Christian People's Party
 Contigo
Philippines:
 Nacionalista Party
Poland:
 Law and Justice
 Civic Platform
 Polish People's Party
 Christian National Union
 Coalition for the Renewal of the Republic - Liberty and Hope
 Congress of the New Right
 League of Polish Families
 National Movement
 Poland Together
 Real Politics Union
 Right Wing of the Republic
 Self-Defence of the Republic of Poland
Portugal:
 Democratic and Social Centre – People's Party
 People's Monarchist Party

R
Romania:
 National Liberal Party
 Alliance for the Union of Romanians
Russia:
 United Russia
 Party of Growth

S
Saint Kitts and Nevis:
 People's Action Movement
Saint Lucia:
 United Workers Party
Saint Vincent and the Grenadines:
 New Democratic Party
Serbia:
 Democratic Party of Serbia
 Serbian Radical Party
 Dveri
 Serbian Party Oathkeepers
 Serbian Right
 Serbian Patriotic Alliance
 Serbian People's Party
 Alliance of Vojvodina Hungarians
 United Serbia
 People's Peasant Party
 Justice and Reconciliation Party
 Party for Democratic Action
 Party of Democratic Action of Sandžak
 Better Serbia
 Statehood Movement of Serbia
 Fatherland
 New Serbia
 People's Party
 People's Freedom Movement
 Movement for the Restoration of the Kingdom of Serbia
 Healthy Serbia
Slovakia
 Christian Democratic Movement
 Ordinary People and Independent Personalities
 Democrats
 Christian Union
 Slovak National Party
 Alliance
 NOVA
 Civic Conservative Party
Slovenia
Slovenian Democratic Party
New Slovenia
Slovenian People's Party
South Korea:
 People Power Party
 Our Republican Party
 Pro-Park New Party
Spain:
 Asturias Forum
 Navarrese People's Union
 People's Party
 Vox
Sri Lanka:
 United National Party
Sweden:
 Christian Democrats
 Moderate Party
 Sweden Democrats
Switzerland:
 Federal Democratic Union of Switzerland
 Swiss People's Party

T
Taiwan:
 Kuomintang (Chinese Nationalist Party)
 Thailand
 Democrat Party
 Palang Pracharath Party
Turkey:
 Justice and Development Party
 Future Party

U
United Kingdom:
 Conservative Party
 UK Independence Party
 Ulster Unionist Party (Northern Ireland)
 Democratic Unionist Party (Northern Ireland)
Traditional Unionist Voice (Northern Ireland)
United States:
 Republican Party
Uruguay:
 National Party

Organizations
 International Democrat Union
 Democrat Union of Africa
 Union of Latin American Parties
 Asia Pacific Democrat Union
 Caribbean Democrat Union

See also

 List of Christian democratic parties
 Centrist Democrat International
 Lists of political parties

References

Lists of political parties
 
Parties by country

ja:ごぼうの党